The Avenue U station is a local station on the BMT Brighton Line of the New York City Subway,  located at Avenue U between East 15th and East 16th Streets in Homecrest and Sheepshead Bay, Brooklyn. The station is served by the Q train at all times.

History 
The original station was opened on the surface Brighton Beach Railroad at Avenue U near East 15th Street, c.1902, coincident with the building of the community of Homecrest, It was closed during elevation of the Brighton Line and the current station opened around 1908.

It underwent more recent reconstruction from December 2008 to January 2010. Both platforms were rebuilt with new windscreens, canopies, and tactile strip edges. A temporary platform over the express tracks was used to provide service on the side that was under rebuilding.

Station layout

The station is located on a raised earthen embankment. There are four tracks and two side platforms. The two center tracks are used by the B express train on weekdays.

Both platforms have beige windscreens with green outlines and frames along their entire lengths and red canopies with green frames in the center. The station signs are in the standard black plates in white lettering and lamp posts are on all support columns of the windscreens in the non-canopied areas. The Coney Island-bound platform has a storage area above the mezzanine staircase.

The 2011 artwork here is called Brooklyn Wildfires by Jason Middlebrook and Miotto Mosaic Art Studio. It is installed on the walls of the Coney Island-bound platform's staircase and consists of ceramic tiling and glass mosaic depicting various species of wildflowers.

Exit
The station has one ground-level station house directly underneath the tracks and platforms on the north side of Avenue U. It has a token booth, turnstile bank, and double-wide staircase going up to the Coney Island-bound platform and two standard width staircases to the Manhattan-bound one. The Coney Island-bound staircase landing splits below a landing, one side leading to the station house and the other bypassing it with two exit-only turnstiles leading directly to the sidewalk. The Coney Island-bound platform also has a metal door leading to a closed staircase that goes down to the north side of Avenue U.

References

External links 

 
 
 Station Reporter — Q Train
 The Subway Nut — Avenue U Pictures
 Flickr - Brooklyn Wildfires
 Avenue U entrance from Google Maps Street View
 Platforms from Google Maps Street View

U
New York City Subway stations in Brooklyn
Railway stations in the United States opened in 1908
1908 establishments in New York City